Langston Hughes House is a historic home located in Harlem, Manhattan, New York City. It is an Italianate style dwelling built in 1869. It is a three story with basement, rowhouse faced in brownstone and measuring 20 feet wide and 45 feet deep. Noted African American poet and author Langston Hughes (1902-1967) occupied the top floor as his workroom from 1947 to 1967.

It was listed on the National Register of Historic Places in 1982, and was designated as a city landmark by the New York City Landmarks Preservation Commission in 1981.

See also
 List of New York City Designated Landmarks in Manhattan above 110th Street
 National Register of Historic Places listings in Manhattan above 110th Street

References

Houses on the National Register of Historic Places in Manhattan
Italianate architecture in New York City
Houses completed in 1869
Houses in Manhattan
Harlem
New York City Designated Landmarks in Manhattan
1869 establishments in New York (state)